Janet Violet Paisley (12 January 1948 – 9 November 2018) was a writer, poet and playwright from Scotland, writing in Scots and English. Her work has been translated into German, Russian, Lithuanian, Slovak, Spanish, Hungarian, Ukrainian, Italian and Polish.

Career
Paisley was a member of the Working Party for a Scottish National Theatre, the SAC Scots Language Synergy, and the Cross Party Parliamentary Group for the Scots Language. She held three Creative Writing Fellowships, received two Scottish Arts Council Writer's Bursaries and a Playwright's Bursary, edited New Writing Scotland and co-ordinated the first Scottish PEN Women Writers Committee.

Her first play Refuge won the Peggy Ramsay Award in 1996. She was awarded a Creative Scotland Award to write Not for Glory (2000), a collection of interlinked short stories in Scots set in a small village in Central Scotland. Not for Glory was one of the ten Scottish finalists voted for by the public in the 2003 World Book Day 'We are what we read' poll.

The short film Long Haul, written by Paisley, received a BAFTA nomination in 2001.

Paisley was the mother of seven sons, including the actor David Paisley. One son died in early childhood.

Death
Janet Paisley died on 9 November 2018, at the age of 70.

Posthumous honours
On 1 December 2018 Janet was posthumously awarded an MG Alba Trad Music Award for Services to the Scots Language, sponsored by Scots Radio. The award was subsequently renamed the Janet Paisley Services to Scots Award in her honour.

References

External links
 Archive of her Official website
 Penguin books

1948 births
2018 deaths
Scottish women poets
Scottish women dramatists and playwrights
20th-century Scottish dramatists and playwrights
21st-century Scottish dramatists and playwrights
20th-century Scottish women writers
21st-century Scottish writers
21st-century Scottish women writers
Scots-language poets
20th-century Scottish poets
21st-century Scottish poets
Scots-language writers